"America" is Killing Joke's first single from their seventh studio album, Outside the Gate. It was released by E.G. Records on 18 April 1988. It was the first official single by Killing Joke to be self-produced, after the departure of producer Chris Kimsey.

The single was accompanied by a satirical music video depicting Jaz Coleman as a presidential candidate and dressed as Uncle Sam, in a dystopian scene of the United States.

"America" charted at No. 77 on the UK Singles Chart.

Track listings 
The song was first released as a 7" single with "Jihad" as the B-side. It was also released as a 12" single in the UK and Germany, featuring "America (The Extended Mix)" as the A-side, and "Jihad" and a remix of "America" by Glenn Skinner on the B-side.

This was the first single by Killing Joke to be released as a CD maxi single, featuring the Glenn Skinner remix of "America", "Jihad (Beyrouth Edit)", "America (The Extended Mix)" and the original 1980 remix of "Change".

7" single 
Side A
"America" – 03:47

Side B
"Jihad" – 06:00

12" single 
Both versions of "America" were mixed by Glenn Skinner. 
Side A
"America (The Extended Mix)" – 06:45

Side B
"Jihad" – 05:26
"America" – 03:44

CD maxi single 
Both versions of "America" were mixed by Glenn Skinner.

"America" – 03:44
"Jihad (Beyrouth Edit)" – 05:08
"America (The Extended Mix)" – 06:45
"Change (Original 1980 Mix)" – 04:00

Charts

References

External links 

1988 songs
Killing Joke songs
Songs written by Jaz Coleman
Songs written by Geordie Walker
E.G. Records singles